Srowot Station (SWT) is a class III railway station located in Gondangan, Jogonalan, Klaten Regency. The station, which is located at an altitude of +152 m, is an active train station at the highest altitude in Operation Region VI Yogyakarta.

Initially, this station had five
railway lines with line 1 being a straight line and two shifting lines for loading and unloading freight services. Since the operation of the Yogyakarta–Solo double tracks to  Station in 2001 and the – segment as of 15 December 2003, line 2 has been used as a new straight line towards Solo. Per 2005–2006, line 1 is a straight line in the direction of Yogyakarta.

To support double tracks operation, the mechanical signaling system at this station was replaced with an electric signaling system made by PT Len Industri which had been installed since 2013 and only started operating on 12 February 2019.

Previously, Srowot Station was one of the stations that had revenue from freight transportation because it was the end station for transporting sugar and molasses (molasses) belonging to the Sugar factory Gondang Winangoen, Klaten until the 1990s. Therefore, this station and the Sugar factory were previously connected by an intersection to the east of the station emplacement. This special route to the Sugar factory area was once passed by a steam locomotive made by Backer & Rueb (Breda), the Netherlands in 1896. This route now only leaves a path, including a bridge that only leaves a frame.

Starting 10 February 2021, to coincide with the launch of the 2021 train travel chart, this station together with three other stations (Ceper Station, Gawok Station, and Delanggu Station) have started serving KRL Commuterline across Yogyakarta-Solo Balapan.

Services
The following is a list of train services at the Srowot Station.

References

External links
 

Klaten Regency
railway stations in Central Java